Katharina Borchert (born Bochum, 1972) is the Chief Innovation Officer at Mozilla. She is a German journalist and was previously the managing director at Spiegel Online. Borchert served on the Mozilla Board of Directors from 2014 to 2015, before her appointment as CIO.

She studied law and journalism at the Universities Hamburg and Lausanne.

Katharina Borchert is the daughter of the former German Minister Jochen Borchert (1993–1998, CDU).

References

German journalists
German women journalists
German newspaper journalists
Der Spiegel people
Westdeutsche Allgemeine Zeitung people
1972 births
Living people